The siege of Pilsen lasted from 14 July 1433 to 9 May 1434 and was an important encounter of the Hussite Wars. Hussite troops led by Prokop the Great had unsuccessfully besieged the Catholic city of Pilsen for nine months and twenty three days. Failure to capture one of the last major Catholic cities in Bohemia along with the fall of New Town was a huge blow for the Hussite groups that foreshadowed their decisive defeat in the Battle of Lipany.

References
 Cornejo, Peter. Lipanská crossroads: causes, course and historical significance in one battle. Praha: Panorama, 1992. 277 pp. .
 Cornejo, Peter. Secret Czech chronicles: journey to the roots of the Hussite tradition. 2nd ed. Praha; Litomyšl: Paseka, 2003. 456 pp. . Chapter Lipany, pp. 253–312.
 Cornejo, Peter; Belin, Paul. Famous battles in our history. 2nd ed. Praha: Marsyas, 1995. 272 pp. . Chapter Pilsen 1433/1434, pp. 75–80.
 Šmahel, Francis. Hussite revolution. 3rd chronicle of the war years. Praha: Karolinum, 1996. 420 pp. .

1433 in Europe
1434 in Europe
Pilsen 1433
Pilsen 1433
Battles in Bohemia
Conflicts in 1433
Conflicts in 1434
Prokop the Great
Plzeň
History of the Plzeň Region